Florian Escales (born 3 February 1996) is a French professional footballer who plays as a goalkeeper for  club Annecy.

Club career 
Training with Marseille since the age of eight, Escales played with the reserve team from 2013. He signed his first professional contract with the club in July 2016. He made his professional debut on 13 December 2018 in the UEFA Europa League against Apollon Limassol. He played the full 90 minutes in a 3–1 away loss.

In June 2019 Escales left Marseille and signed for Laval. His senior league debut came in the Championnat National game against Le Puy on 2 August 2019.

In June 2020 Escales moved to Bastia-Borgo, also in the Championnat National. On 12 June 2021, he moved to Annecy in the same league.

Career statistics

References

External links
 
 
 

1996 births
Living people
Sportspeople from Aix-en-Provence
French footballers
France youth international footballers
Association football goalkeepers
Ligue 1 players
Championnat National players
Championnat National 2 players
Championnat National 3 players
Olympique de Marseille players
Stade Lavallois players
FC Bastia-Borgo players
FC Annecy players
Footballers from Provence-Alpes-Côte d'Azur